The INS Sufa (Storm) is a Sa'ar 4.5-class missile boat of the Israeli Navy, built by Israel Shipyards Ltd. and commissioned in May 2003.

The ship is not the first to use this name, which was also used by a previous Sa'ar 3-class missile boat which was the command ship at "Operation Noa" in which the remaining 5 boats (including itself) escaped from Cherbourg (France) during the French embargo in 1969.

See also
 INS Herev
 INS Tarshish

References

External links
Navy rescues 'mystery man' at sea - Jerusalem Post
Navy to partake in Turkish exercise - Jerusalem Post
World Navies Today: Israel

2003 ships
Ships built in Israel
Sa'ar 4.5-class missile boats
Naval ships of Israel
Missile boats of the Israeli Navy